Claudiu Mircea Ionescu (born 20 March 1983) is a Romanian football player, currently under contract with Liga IV club Montana Pătârlagele.

External links
 
 

1983 births
Living people
Romanian footballers
Liga I players
Liga II players
Cypriot First Division players
AFC Rocar București players
FC Politehnica Iași (2010) players
FC Milsami Orhei players
FC Steaua București players
FC Gloria Buzău players
FC Politehnica Iași (1945) players
FC Politehnica Timișoara players
Aris Limassol FC players
Foolad FC players
CS Concordia Chiajna players
AFC Dacia Unirea Brăila players
Association football midfielders
Expatriate footballers in Moldova
Romanian expatriate footballers
Expatriate footballers in Cyprus
Romanian expatriate sportspeople in Cyprus
Expatriate footballers in Iran
Romanian expatriate sportspeople in Iran
Footballers from Bucharest